Tilsahari is a town in Kanpur district in the state of Uttar Pradesh, India. Nearby towns include Narwal and Maharajpur, 10 km north and 7 km west respectively.

Geography
It has an average elevation of 122 meters (403 feet).

Mass transit
The airport servicing the area is C A Kanpur Airport. Rail connection is supplied by Kanpur Central Railway Station.

Sources
Tilsahri, india9.com

Cities and towns in Kanpur Nagar district